Omnibus is an arts-based British documentary series, broadcast mainly on BBC 1 in the United Kingdom. The programme was the successor to the arts-based series Monitor.

It ran from 1967 until 2003, usually being transmitted on Sunday evenings. During its 35-year history, the programme won 12 British Academy of Film and Television Arts (BAFTA) awards.

Among the series' best remembered documentaries are:
Song of Summer (1968) biographical film by Ken Russell about Frederick Delius and Eric Fenby
Cracked Actor (1975), a profile of David Bowie during the peak of his cocaine addiction
Fear and Loathing on the Road to Hollywood (1978), follows American Gonzo Journalist Hunter S. Thompson and British artist Ralph Steadman on a trip to Hollywood during the development of a film based on Thompson's life and work.
Rene Magritte (1979), a graduate film by David Wheatley;
Leonard Bernstein's West Side Story – a documentary about a 1984 studio recording of Leonard Bernstein conducting his own music from West Side Story. Bernstein had not previously conducted the 1957 musical. The episode won the Robert Flaherty Award for the best television documentary in 1986.
Van Gogh (1991)
Anna Benson-Gyles Madonna: Behind the American dream (1990), a film produced by Nadia Hagger. 7.7 million people watched this episode, which was slightly higher that the average audience of 3.1 million.
Profile of British film director Ridley Scott (1992)
A two-hour career overview of director Jean Renoir (1995)
A documentary about The K Foundation's various art projects (1995).

For one season in 1982, the series was in a magazine format presented by Barry Norman.

In 2001, the BBC announced that the programme was being switched to BBC Two, prompting accusations that the corporation was further marginalising its arts programming. BBC controller of arts commissioning Roly Keating defended the move, saying "the documentary strand will be able to tackle a wider range of subjects." Regarded as its "flagship arts programme", Omnibus was one of only two regular arts platforms broadcast at the time by the BBC.

In late 2002, the BBC announced that Omnibus would be cancelled the following year, to be replaced by the arts series Imagine, hosted by Alan Yentob.

See also
 Omnibus (American TV program)

References

External links

1967 British television series debuts
2003 British television series endings
1960s British documentary television series
1970s British documentary television series
1980s British documentary television series
1990s British documentary television series
2000s British documentary television series
BBC television documentaries
English-language television shows